Walter Green may refer to:

Walter Green (MP for Bridgnorth), in 1406/07, MP for Bridgnorth (UK Parliament constituency)
Walter Green (died 1456), MP for Middlesex (UK Parliament constituency)
Walter Green (politician) British politician, MP for Deptford 1935-1945
Walter G. Green (1892–1962), member of the Mississippi House of Representatives
Wally Green, former international motorcycle speedway rider
Wally Green, table tennis player

See also
Walter Greene (disambiguation)